Harvest Preparatory School is a private school located in Canal Winchester, Ohio affiliated with the World Harvest Church and run by the church's founder, Pastor Rod Parsley.

Athletics

Ohio High School Athletic Association State Championships

 Boys Basketball - 2019*
 Girls Basketball - 2010, 2011*

References

External links
Harvest Preparatory School Website

High schools in Franklin County, Ohio
Private high schools in Ohio
Private middle schools in Ohio
Private elementary schools in Ohio